Walter Campbell Mackenzie  (August 17, 1909December 15, 1978) was a Canadian surgeon and academic.

Born in Glace Bay, Cape Breton, Mackenzie received his BSc in 1927 and MD in 1932 from Dalhousie University and was honoured as one of two Malcolm Honour Society Medal winners. He began surgery training at McGill University then moved to the Mayo Clinic in 1933 to complete his MSc.  From 1940 to 1945 served in the Royal Canadian Navy where he was promoted to surgeon-commander.

He was a professor and chairman of the Department of Surgery at the University of Alberta's Faculty of Medicine. From 1959 to 1974, he was dean of the Faculty of Medicine.

In 1949, he was a founding director and shareholder of the Edmonton Eskimos.

In 1970, he was made an officer of the Order of Canada "for his contribution to surgery and medical education". In 2014, he was inducted into the Canadian Medical Hall of Fame.

The Walter C. Mackenzie Health Sciences Centre in Edmonton, Alberta, is named in his honour.  The centre was opened under the Conservative government of Peter Lougheed.

References
 Dr. Walter C. Mackenzie (1909-78) Edmonton 100 Years of Medicine in Alberta

1909 births
1978 deaths
Canadian surgeons
Canadian university and college faculty deans
Officers of the Order of Canada
Academic staff of the University of Alberta
People from Glace Bay
20th-century Canadian physicians
20th-century surgeons
People from Baddeck, Nova Scotia